Henry Jacques ("Jack") Gaisman (December 5, 1869 – August 6, 1974) was an American philanthropist and inventor of a type of safety razor, the autographic camera, and over one thousand other patents which benefited common items such as swivel chairs, men's belts and carburetors.

History
His father, Jacques Gaisman (né Geissmann), was an immigrant originally from Dornach, a village near Mulhouse, France (in the Alsace region bordering Germany and France), but who fled worsening political pressures, and immigrated to New Orleans in 1852. His parents Sarah and Jacques married in Memphis, Tennessee in 1864.

Henry J. Gaisman was born in 1869 in Memphis, Tennessee, the youngest of four children. His father, Jacques, died in Memphis during a Yellow Fever epidemic when Henry was age 3. After his father's death, his mother, Sarah, moved the family to Cincinnati, OH, where Henry spent some of his early childhood trying to help support his family by working as a newsboy. Already at age 9 Henry invented a medium for street car advertising. Unable to afford the lengthy schooling required to study mechanical engineering and chemistry (his first interests), he left school at age 13 to work various odd jobs. At age 16 he invented the glass-enclosed bulletin boards commonly used in hotel lobbies. He then worked briefly as a leather worker, then a leather dealer, and in 1894 moved to New York City, where he sold his first financially successful invention, a belt that wouldn't slip. Later, he invented the safety razor, an invention which would allow him to develop into a wealthy businessman despite never completing his formal education.

His safety razor was patented in May and July 1904, and was initially sold by the Auto Strop Safety Razor Company, a competitor to razor and blade manufacturer Gillette Razor Corporation, run by Mr. King C. Gillette. When Mr. Gaisman found similar technologies in the Gillette razors, his company sued the Gillette Razor Corporation for patent infringement, which Mr. Gillette resolved by merging with Auto Strop. When Mr. Gaisman came on board at the Gillette corporation, he found financial reporting errors which shook investor confidence and briefly caused the Gillette stock to drop. When Mr. Gillette eventually died at age 77, Mr. Gaisman went on to become the leader of the Gillette Razor Corporation.

In 1914, he also developed the autographic camera, a process where photographers could write small notes on the edge of their negatives. The rights to this process were purchased by George Eastman (of Eastman Kodak) in 1914 for the sum of $300,000.

After his razorblade patent ran out in 1921, he continued to develop newer razorblade technologies in an effort to protect his patent. On November 21, 1922, he applied for a new patent on a newer razor technology with a double-edged safety blade that would fit into the Gillette handles, but the Gillette blades would not fit into his newer handles. On June 28, 1927, he was granted the patent for this newer "Probak" razor, and in 1928 he founded the Probak Razor Corporation.

In 1932, at age 63 and still a bachelor, he moved from his Park Avenue apartment home to Hartsdale, NY after purchasing  of land from George Christiancy, former U.S. Minister to Peru and stockbroker. Shortly thereafter, he purchased  of adjacent undeveloped land from the Healy estate, the neighboring A.P. Theobald estate, and a tract from the Kuzmier estate, giving him a total of  along Ridge Road in Hartsdale.

The Business Week magazine of 26 November 1930 described Mr. Gaisman as "... of medium height, of benign mien. He lives in a Park Avenue apartment in a state of contented batchelorhood [sic] ... He has voiced doubts as to whether any woman could live with him. The doubt applies to unconventional working habits and not to personal disposition. If he gets an idea in the middle of the night there is no more sleep for him. Like Gillette, Gaisman is an incurable inventor. Also like Gillette, Gaisman possesses a quality notoriously lacking in most inventors – shrewd executive ability." He retired from the Gilette Safety Razor Corporation in 1938, at which time he was reputed to be worth more than 25 million dollars.

In 1948, while in Mt. Sinai hospital for routine medical care, he met Catherine ("Kitty") Vance (1919 - May 1, 2010), then a 29-year-old nursing supervisor and native of New Rochelle. Four years later, on 18 April 1952, at age 82, he married Catherine, then aged 33. Initially, the couple considered selling their land to Westchester County to build a new site for the Westchester Community College. However, the couple changed their plans before the deal could be completed, and despite County threats to take the land through condemnation, he and his wife Catherine passed the title for their land to the New York Archdiocese in 1957 for $600,000, with the provision they could live on the estate as long as they wished. (The Westchester Community College was eventually built on the  John Augustine Hartford estate on Grasslands Road in Valhalla.)

In 1971, at age 101, Mr. Gaisman was quoted in Who Said what (and When, and Where, and How) as saying, "I don't think that what anyone does is worth too much attention. I like to know what's going on. I want to be alive."

Mr. Gaisman died in White Plains in 1974, at age 104, and was buried at the Gates of Heaven cemetery in Hawthorne. His wife continued to live on the estate until 1995, when she moved to Connecticut to live near family. On May 1, 2010 she suddenly died at Mount Sinai Hospital in New York at the age of 91. She was buried beside her husband.

The estate in Hartsdale was used as a home for retired Catholic nuns, and has since been purchased by the town of Greenburgh, where it has been turned into a nature preserve. Retired nuns continue to live on the estate today.

References

External links
Google Patent Search for Henry J. Gaisman
Obituary for Catherine V. Gaisman

1869 births
1974 deaths
American centenarians
Men centenarians
19th-century American inventors
20th-century American inventors
Philanthropists from New York (state)
People from Memphis, Tennessee
People from Cincinnati
People from Hartsdale, New York
People from White Plains, New York
Burials at Gate of Heaven Cemetery (Hawthorne, New York)